Noluthando Dorian Bahedile Orleyn, commonly known as Thandi Orleyn, (born 1956) is a South African lawyer and business executive who has been active mainly in the financial sector. She is a co-founder and executive director of Peotona Group Holdings.

Orleyn was born in Port Elizabeth on 13 January 1956. She received her secondary education at Inanda Seminary School before studying law at the University of Fort Hare and the University of South Africa. Orleyn chairs the board of BP Southern Africa and serves on the boards of Toyota SA and Toyota Financial Services (South Africa). She has also served as a non-executive director of the South African Reserve Bank.

References

1956 births
Living people
People from Port Elizabeth
South African businesspeople
University of Fort Hare alumni
University of South Africa alumni
South African women lawyers
20th-century South African lawyers
21st-century South African lawyers
20th-century women lawyers
21st-century women lawyers